Hirebidanur is a village in the southern state of Karnataka, India. It is located in the Gauribidanur taluk of Chikkaballapura district in Karnataka. It is situated 2 km away from sub-district headquarter Gauribidanur and 33 km away from district headquarter Chikkaballapura.

Demographics
According to Census 2011 information the location code or village code of Hirebidanur village is 623257.  Hirebidanur village is also a gram panchayat. Villages comes under Hirebidanur gram Panchayat are 
Veerlagollhalli, Moorumanehalli, Kurubarahalli, Herebidanur and Cheegatagere.

The total geographical area of village is 369.38 hectares. Hirebidanur has a total population of 5,815 peoples with 3,095 males and 2,720 females. There are about 1265 houses in Hirebidanur village. Gauribidanur is nearest town to Hirebidanur which is approximately 2 km away.

Economy
People belonging to the Hirebidanur village grow very much maize, millet silk, etc. The major occupations of the residents of Hirebidanur are dairy farming. The dairy cooperative is the largest individual milk supplying cooperative in the state.

Facilities
Hirebidanur has below types of facilities.

 Government higher primary School
 Government high School
 Government First Grade College
 Hirebidanur KMF (Karnataka Milk Federation) Dairy
 Government Grocery store
 Hirebidanur Gram Panchayat Office
 Government Primary health center
 Government Nursery School
 Post Office
 Gram Panchayat Library
 Netaji Stadium
 Sri chowdeshwari kalyana mantapa
 Canara Bank (CNRB0004449)
 KSRTC Depot

Temples 
 Gangamma Temple
 Basaveswara temple

See also
Alakapura

References

External links
 https://chikkaballapur.nic.in/en/

Villages in Chikkaballapur district